Bond Street is a 1948 British portmanteau drama film directed by Gordon Parry and based on a story by Terence Rattigan. It stars Jean Kent, Roland Young, Kathleen Harrison, and Derek Farr. The film depicts a bride's dress, veil, pearls and flowers purchased in London's Bond Street—and the secret story behind each item.

Plot

There is no overarching story, other than a series of short stories, each linking to Bond street.

Stories include: a deliberately ripped dress; a man ripping his trousers, and getting a lunch-date with the seamstress; and a man trying to avoid a suddenly materialised love interest from Denmark.

Cast
 Jean Kent as Ricki Merritt 
 Roland Young as George Chester-Barrett 
 Kathleen Harrison as Ethel Brawn 
 Derek Farr as Joe Marsh 
 Hazel Court as Julia Chester-Barrett 
 Ronald Howard as Steve Winter 
 Paula Valenska as Elsa 
 Patricia Plunkett as Mary Phillips 
 Robert Flemyng as Frank Moody 
 Adrianne Allen as Mrs. Taverner 
 Kenneth Griffith as Len Phillips 
 Joan Dowling as Norma 
 Charles Goldner as Waiter 
 James McKechnie as Inspector Yarrow 
 Leslie Dwyer as Barman
 Aubrey Mallalieu as Parkins
 Darcy Conyers as Bank Clerk

Critical reception
'Britmovie' called the film an "entertaining portmanteau comedy-drama charting the events occurring during a typical 24-hour period on London’s thoroughfare Bond Street. Linking the four stories together is the impending wedding of society girl Hazel Court and Robert Flemyng. Producer Anatole de Grunwald and co-writer Terence Rattigan would later revisit the formula for Anthony Asquith’s The V.I.P.s (1963) and The Yellow Rolls-Royce (1964)."
The New York Times called the film "an entertainment grab bag, which, in this case, means that some of the parts are better than the whole...But this spectator's favorite Bond Street interlude is the final chapter, concerning a bouquet and an old flame who turns up at an inopportune time to claim the groom as her own. Roland Young is vastly amusing as the droll father of the prospective bride...Bond Street is fresh enough to have a certain amount of novelty appeal which helps to compensate for the inconsistencies of its dramatic construction. It may not be in a class with Quartet, a handy point of reference, but the new film can stand on its own merits with any audience that is willing to accept half a loaf."

Trade papers called the film a "notable box office attraction" in British cinemas in 1948.

References

External links

Review of film at Variety

1948 films
1948 drama films
British drama films
Films directed by Gordon Parry
British anthology films
Films set in London
Films with screenplays by Terence Rattigan
Films with screenplays by Anatole de Grunwald
Films produced by Anatole de Grunwald
Films scored by Benjamin Frankel
British black-and-white films
1940s British films